The Zotye T500 was a compact CUV produced by Zotye Auto that debuted during the 2017 Shanghai Auto Show.

Overview

The power of the Zotye T500 CUV comes from a 1.5 liter turbo engine producing 156 hp and mated to a five-speed manual gearbox.

The production T500 model debuted in March 2018. Pricing of the T500 ranges from 78,800 yuan to 149,800 yuan.

References

Notes

External links

 

Cars of China
T500
Crossover sport utility vehicles
Compact sport utility vehicles
Front-wheel-drive vehicles
Cars introduced in 2017